The club-winged manakin (Machaeropterus deliciosus) is a small passerine bird which is a resident breeding species in the cloud forest on the western slopes of the Andes Mountains of Colombia and northwestern Ecuador. The manakins are a family (Pipridae) of small bird species of subtropical and tropical Central and South America.

Sound-making mechanism

Like several other manakins, the club-winged manakin produces a mechanical sound with its extremely modified secondary remiges, an effect known as sonation. The manakins adapted their wings in this odd way as a result of sexual selection. In manakins, the males have evolved adaptations to suit the females' attraction towards sound. Wing sounds in various manakin lineages have evolved independently. Some species pop like a firecracker, and there are a couple that make whooshing noises in flight. The club-winged manakin has the unique ability to produce musical sounds with its wings.

Each wing of the club-winged manakin has one feather with a series of at least seven ridges along its central vane. Next to the strangely ridged feather is another feather with a stiff, curved tip. When the bird raises its wings over its back, it shakes them back and forth over 100 times a second (hummingbirds typically flap their wings only 50 times a second). Each time it hits a ridge, the tip produces a sound. The tip strikes each ridge twice: once as the feathers collide, and once as they move apart again. This raking movement allows a wing to produce 14 sounds during each shake. By shaking its wings 100 times a second, the club-winged manakin can produce up to 1,400 single sounds during that time. In order to withstand the repeated beating of its wings together, the club-winged manakin has evolved solid wing bones (by comparison, the bones of most birds are hollow, making flight easier). The wing bones are not as efficient for flying, but are what has evolved via sexual selection.

While this "spoon-and-washboard" anatomy is a well-known sound-producing apparatus in insects (see stridulation), it had not been well documented in vertebrates (some snakes stridulate too, but they do not have dedicated anatomical features for it).

References

External links
 ffrench, Richard; O'Neill, John Patton & Eckelberry, Don R. (1991): A guide to the birds of Trinidad and Tobago (2nd edition). Comstock Publishing, Ithaca, N.Y.. 
Hilty, Steven L. (2003): Birds of Venezuela. Christopher Helm, London. 
Stiles, F. Gary & Skutch, Alexander Frank (1989): A guide to the birds of Costa Rica. Comistock, Ithaca.
Bio One
2005-07-25 Cornell University News Service Rare South American bird 'sings' with its feathers to attract a mate, Cornell researcher finds
Bird "Sings" Through Feathers on National Geographic

club-winged manakin
Birds of the Colombian Andes
Birds of the Ecuadorian Andes
club-winged manakin
club-winged manakin